Algonquin and Lakeshore Catholic District School Board (ALCDSB) is a separate school board in Ontario, Canada. The school board is the school district administrator for Roman Catholic schools in the western portions of Eastern Ontario, including Napanee, Kingston, Belleville and Quinte West.

Elementary schools
Archbishop O'Sullivan Catholic School
École Catholique Cathédrale
Georges Vanier Catholic School
St. Francis of Assisi Catholic School
Holy Name Catholic School
Holy Name of Mary Catholic School
Annex - St. Mary Catholic School (Shannonville)
Holy Rosary Catholic School
J.J. O'Neill Catholic School
Annex - St. Patrick Catholic School
John XXIII Catholic School
Mother Teresa Catholic School
Our Lady of Fatima Catholic School
Our Lady of Lourdes Catholic School
Our Lady of Mercy Catholic School
Annex - St. Martin Catholic School
Our Lady of Mount Carmel Catholic School
Sacred Heart Catholic School
Sacred Heart Catholic School
St. Carthagh Catholic School
St. Gregory Catholic School
St. Joseph Catholic School
St. Marguerite Bourgeoys Catholic School
St. Martha Catholic School
St. Mary Catholic School
St. Michael Catholic School
St. Patrick Catholic School
Annex - St. Mary Catholic School
Annex - St. James Major Catholic School
St. Patrick Catholic School
St. Paul Catholic School
Annex - Sacred Heart Catholic School
St. Peter Catholic School
St. Peter Catholic School
St. Thomas More Catholic School
Annex - St.Joseph/St. Mary Catholic School

Secondary schools
Holy Cross Catholic Secondary School, Kingston
Nicholson Catholic College, Belleville
Regiopolis-Notre Dame Catholic High School, Kingston
St. Paul Catholic Secondary School, Trenton
St. Theresa Catholic Secondary School, Belleville

ALCDSB Student Senate 
The Student Senate of the Algonquin and Lakeshore Catholic District School Board is a board wide level of student government that is composed of representatives from each of the school board's five secondary schools: Regiopolis Notre Dame, Holy Cross Catholic Secondary School, St. Theresa Catholic Secondary School, Nicholson Catholic College, and St. Paul Catholic Secondary School. Some of the student senate's purposes include representing the voice of all ALCDSB students, establishing and strengthening communication and a transfer of knowledge between the student councils of each secondary school, and to enact short and long term initiatives to better the student environment in the ALCDSB.

See also
List of school districts in Ontario
List of high schools in Ontario

External links
 Algonquin and Lakeshore Catholic District School Board official website

Roman Catholic school districts in Ontario